Houston, Texas has many airports due to it being the 4th largest city in the United States. Here are some of the airports:



List 

Houston Area, Greater